Minnesota State Highway 248 (MN 248) is a  highway in southeast Minnesota, which runs from its intersection with Winona County Road 33 in Altura east to its terminus at its intersection with U.S. Highway 61 just north of Minnesota City, near Winona.

Route description
Highway 248 serves as an east–west route in southeast Minnesota between Altura, Rollingstone, and Minnesota City.

Highway 248 is also known as Main Street in Altura.

The route passes through the Richard J. Dorer State Forest.

The route is legally defined as Route 248 in the Minnesota Statutes.

History
Highway 248 was authorized on July 1, 1949.

The route was paved when it was marked.

Major intersections

References

External links

Highway 248 at the Unofficial Minnesota Highways Page

248
Transportation in Winona County, Minnesota